Down That Road may refer to:

 "Down That Road" (Shara Nelson song), 1993
 "Down That Road" (Alisan Porter song), 2016